Buin Airport (IATA:UBI) was an airport located near Kara, Bougainville Island, Papua New Guinea.

History

World War II
The airfield was constructed by the Imperial Japanese Navy Air Service in 1943 and known as Kara Airfield and Toripoil Airfield.

Postwar
The airport was used by Air Niugini and other local carriers for air service to the Buin area, however the airport was destroyed during the Bougainville Crisis.

See also
Buka Airport
Kahili Airfield
Kieta Airport

External links
https://web.archive.org/web/20120614000050/http://www.pacificwrecks.com/airfields/png/kara/index.html

Airports in Papua New Guinea
Autonomous Region of Bougainville
Defunct airports in Papua New Guinea